A Master Builder is a 2013 film directed by Jonathan Demme, based on Henrik Ibsen's 1892 play The Master Builder. The film was released in the United States in June 2014 and stars Wallace Shawn, Julie Hagerty, Lisa Joyce and Andre Gregory. The film is a production of the Ibsen play dealing with the relationship between an aging architect and a younger woman. The play originally premiered in 1893.

Plot 
Halvard Solness (Shawn) is an aging architect of a small town in Norway, who has managed to attain some distinction and local reputation; he has long been married to Aline (Hagerty). One day while his friend Doctor Herdal (Pine) is visiting, Solness has another caller: 22-year-old out-of-towner Hilde Wangel (Joyce), whom the Doctor promptly recognizes from a recent trip.

Soon after the Doctor leaves and Solness is alone with Hilde, she reminds him that they are not strangers; they previously met in her home 10 years ago when she was 12. When Solness does not respond to her quickly enough, she reminds him that at one point he made advances to her, offered a romantic interlude, and promised her "castles in the sky" during their encounter, which she believed. He denies this, but she gradually convinces him that she can assist him with his household duties and he brings her into his home.

During the construction of his most recent project, which includes towering steeples, Hilde learns that Solness suffers from acrophobia, a morbid fear of extreme heights, but nonetheless encourages him to climb the steeples to their very heights at the public opening of the newly-completed building. Inspired by her words, Solness begins his ascent to the top of the steeples. At this point it is revealed that this entire time with Hilde been imagined. Solness never left his bed. As, in the imaginary setting, Solness hangs the wreath on the new house he built for his wife, he dies.

Cast 
 Wallace Shawn as  Halvard Solness 
 Julie Hagerty as Aline Solness 
 Lisa Joyce as Hilde Wangel 
 Larry Pine as Dr. Herdal 
 Andre Gregory as Knut Brovik 
 Emily Cass McDonnell as Kaia Fosli 
 Jeff Biehl as Ragnar Brovik

Production 
Andre Gregory said that he was drawn to the play due to his age and the themes of redemption.  Gregory said of Joyce that she is "astounding" and hopes that her career takes off, and Demme said that they were all "blown away" by her performance.

Release 
A Master Builder premiered at the Rome Film Festival under the title Fear of Falling.  Abramorama released the film in New York on July 23, 2014. In February 2015, after a limited theatrical release in several cities in the United States, the film was released for distribution in streaming video through Amazon.

Reception 
Rotten Tomatoes, a review aggregator, reports that 84% of 31 surveyed critics gave the film a positive review; the average rating is 7/10.  Metacritic rated it 62/100 based on eleven reviews. David Edelstein of New York wrote that the film "brings the genius of Ibsen to the screen in a way I never thought was possible."  Jay Weissberg of Variety called it "constricted and uninspired".  Stephen Holden of The New York Times wrote that Shawn "employs insidious sleight of hand to score moral points".  Jordan Mintzer of The Hollywood Reporter wrote, "Wallace Shawn shines in this well-acted piece of filmed theater." The magazine Architectural Record gave the film a mixed review, singling out Julie Hagerty's performance opposite Wallace Shawn as exceptional.

References

External links 
 
A Master Builder: Ibsen in Nyack an essay by Michael Sragow at the Criterion Collection

2013 films
2013 drama films
American drama films
American films based on plays
Films based on works by Henrik Ibsen
Films with screenplays by Wallace Shawn
Films directed by Jonathan Demme
2010s English-language films
2010s American films